Gela is a city in the south of Sicily, Italy.

Gela may also refer to:

 Gela (album), by Baker Boy, 2021
 Gela (moth), a genus of moth
 Gela (river), a river in the city

Other uses
 Gela Calcio, an Italian football club based in Gela
 Gela language, spoken in the Solomon Islands
 Gela, Nepal, a village development committee

See also
 Gêla, a village in Tibet, China
 Gala (disambiguation)